Kyle Rau (born October 24, 1992) is an American professional ice hockey forward currently playing with the Abbotsford Canucks in the American Hockey League (AHL). He was selected by the Florida Panthers in the 3rd round (91st overall) of the 2011 NHL Entry Draft.

Playing career
In following his family ties, Rau first established himself in being a standout player in high school with Eden Prairie High. In his final year in 2011, Rau scored 69 points in just 25 games to earn selection as the Minnesota Mr. Hockey winner, as the best school player in Minnesota. Rau committed and played collegiate hockey within his home state, with the Minnesota Golden Gophers.

In his senior year, Rau captained Minnesota for the 2014–15 season. Leading the Gophers to the Big Ten Conference Championship, he compiled 20 goals and 41 points in 39 games. On March 29, 2015, Rau signalled the end of his college career, having amassed 164 points in 160 contests, in signing a three-year entry-level contract with the Florida Panthers. He was then signed to an amateur try-out contract to complete the season in making his professional debut in the American Hockey League with affiliate, the San Antonio Rampage. Rau scored in his first game with the Rampage on his first shot, in a 7–3 defeat to the Adirondack Flames on April 4, 2015.

After attending the Panthers 2015 training camp, Rau was assigned to being his rookie professional season with new AHL affiliate, the Portland Pirates on September 25, 2015. In the 2015–16 season, Rau quickly adapted to the pro level, scoring 17 goals in just 48 games before he received his first NHL recall to the Panthers on February 19, 2016. He made his NHL debut in a 3–1 victory over the Winnipeg Jets on February 20, 2016.

Following the 2016–17 season with the Panthers, Rau was surprisingly not tendered a qualifying offer as a restricted free agent. On July 1, 2017 he signed as a free agent to a one-year, two-way contract with the Minnesota Wild.

Rau spent most of the 2018-19 season with the Iowa Wild placing second on the team in goals scored with 26, fourth on the team in assists at 27, and third on the team in points with 53. Rau made his debut on January 20, 2018 with the Minnesota Wild, against the Tampa Bay Lightning. He got his first point with the Wild as the secondary assist on a Nate Prosser goal. Rau stayed with the Minnesota Wild for the month of February playing in 6 games before getting sent back down to Iowa.

As a free agent from the Wild after 5 seasons within the organization, Rau remained un-signed leading into the following 2022–23 season. On October 25, 2022, he was signed to a one-year AHL contract with the Abbotsford Canucks, the primary affiliate to the Vancouver Canucks.

Personal
Kyle's older brother, Chad Rau, played NCAA hockey with Colorado College. He also played 9 games in the NHL with the Minnesota Wild and is currently playing in the Kontinental Hockey League for HC Neftekhimik. He also has a brother, Matt, and a twin brother, Curt.

Career statistics

Regular season and playoffs

International

Awards and honors

References

External links
 

1992 births
Living people
Abbotsford Canucks players
AHCA Division I men's ice hockey All-Americans
American twins
American men's ice hockey centers
Florida Panthers draft picks
Florida Panthers players
Ice hockey players from Minnesota
Iowa Wild players
People from Eden Prairie, Minnesota
Minnesota Golden Gophers men's ice hockey players
Minnesota Wild players
Portland Pirates players
San Antonio Rampage players
Sioux Falls Stampede players
Springfield Thunderbirds players
Twin sportspeople